Mulkh Raj  is an Indian politician from the Bharatiya Janata Party and a  member of the Himachal Pradesh Legislative Assembly representing the Baijnath assembly constituency of Himachal Pradesh. He belongs to the Koli community of Himachal Pradesh.

References 

Koli people
Himachal Pradesh politicians
Himachal Pradesh MLAs 2017–2022
Bharatiya Janata Party politicians from Himachal Pradesh
People from Kangra district
Year of birth missing (living people)
Living people